Minzu railway station ("ethnic group") is a railway station located in Sanmin District, Kaohsiung, Taiwan. It is located on the Pingtung line and is operated by the Taiwan Railways Administration. It is served by all local trains.

References

2018 establishments in Taiwan
Railway stations opened in 2018
Railway stations in Kaohsiung
Railway stations served by Taiwan Railways Administration